Meotica is a genus of beetles belonging to the family Staphylinidae.

The species of this genus are found in Europe and Northern America.

Species:
 Meotica aegyptia Pace, 1983 
 Meotica albanica Benick, 1953

References

Staphylinidae
Staphylinidae genera